The Living Greyhawk Gazetteer (LGG) is a sourcebook for the World of Greyhawk campaign setting for the 3rd edition of the Dungeons & Dragons roleplaying game. Despite the title, the Living Greyhawk Gazetteer is not exclusive to the Living Greyhawk Campaign. Other publications linked to the Living Greyhawk Gazetteer have treated it as superior to the D&D Gazetteer and used it in the D&D Gazetteer'''s place.

Contents
The Living Greyhawk Gazetteer expands upon material covered by previous products, such as Gary Gygax's World of Greyhawk Fantasy Game Setting and Carl Sargent's From the Ashes (TSR, 1993).

Publication history
The Living Greyhawk Gazetteer was written by Gary Holian, Erik Mona, Sean K Reynolds, and Frederick Weining, and published in November 2000, featuring a cover by William O'Connor. Interior art was by Joel Biske, Vince Locke, and Daniela Castillo.

Critical response
Of the two Greyhawk Gazetteers (The Living Greyhawk Gazetteer and the D&D Gazetteer) published for the 3rd Edition Dungeons and Dragons game, the Living Greyhawk Gazetteer was better received by players. Most reviews were generally positive, while common misgivings concerned the lack of a full-color layout and the paper-back cover.

See also
 Living Greyhawk
 Greyhawk Adventures Greyhawk: The Adventure Begins''

References

Further reading

External links
Living Greyhawk Gazetteer at Wizards of the Coast
Living Greyhawk Gazetteer at the TSR Archive

Greyhawk books
Role-playing game supplements introduced in 2000